Universal Migrator can refer to either one of two albums by progressive metal project Ayreon:

 Universal Migrator Part 1: The Dream Sequencer
 Universal Migrator Part 2: Flight of the Migrator